Bishop's Green is a hamlet in the civil parish of High Easter in the Uttlesford district of Essex, England. The hamlet is on the road between the villages of High Easter and Barnston.

Bishop's Green's public house is The Spotted Dog.

External links 
 

Hamlets in Essex
Uttlesford